Yoncalık is a village in the Yüksekova District of Hakkâri Province in Turkey. The village is populated by Kurds of the Dirî and Pinyanişî tribes and had a population of 450 in 2021.

The hamlet of Çevreli is attached to Yoncalık.

History 
Missionary Samuel Audley Rhea visited the village during his trips to Kurdistan which Dwight Whitney Marsh wrote about in the book "The Tennesseean in Persia and Koordistan" published in 1869. 

The village was populated by 28 Assyrian families in 1850 and 60 families in 1877.

References 

Villages in Yüksekova District
Kurdish settlements in Hakkâri Province
Historic Assyrian communities in Turkey